was a Japanese samurai general in the Takeda army under Takeda Shingen, and later under Takeda Katsuyori.  He was known as one of the "Twenty-Four Generals of Takeda Shingen". 

He was also lord of Iwadono Castle, and fought under the Takeda at the battles of Kawanakajima, Mikatagahara, Nagashino and Tenmokuzan.

Oyamada betrayed Takeda Katsuyori in 1582, after Katsuyori's defeat at the Battle of Tenmokuzan; however, when he went to the Oda clan camp, he was executed by Oda Nobunaga's officer Horio Yoshiharu.

References

External links 
  "Legendary Takeda's 24 Generals" at Yamanashi-kankou.jp

1545 births
1582 deaths
Samurai
Takeda retainers
Executed Japanese people
16th-century executions by Japan